Dark Lake is the name given to two separate lakes within Independence Township in Oakland County, Michigan.

It connects to Deer Lake on its north side.

It connects to Whipple Lake on its east side.

References

External links
 
 

Lakes of Oakland County, Michigan
Lakes of Michigan
Lakes of Independence Township, Michigan